The Vancouver Warriors is a professional lacrosse team based in Vancouver, British Columbia. The team plays in the National Lacrosse League (NLL). The 2020 season was the 21st in franchise history and the 7th season in Vancouver. The franchise previously played in Everett, Washington, San Jose, and Albany, New York. Due to the COVID-19 pandemic, the season was suspended on March 12, 2020. On April 8, the league made a further public statement announcing the cancellation of the remaining games of the 2020 season and that they would be exploring options for playoffs once it was safe to resume play.

On June 4th, the league confirmed that the playoffs would also be cancelled due to the pandemic.

Regular season

Final standings

Game log

Cancelled games

Roster

See also
2019 NLL season

References

Vancouver
Vancouver Warriors seasons
Vancouver Stealth